The former St. John's Episcopal Church is an historic church building on Maynard Road and Church Street in Framingham, Massachusetts. It is now the Heineman Ecumenical Center at Framingham State University. The university acquired the building in 1969. The church building was designed by local architect Alexander Rice Esty, and was built in 1871.  Esty was a member of the congregation for which it was built, and donated his services.

The building was listed on the National Register of Historic Places on January 12, 1990.

See also
National Register of Historic Places listings in Framingham, Massachusetts

References

Episcopal church buildings in Massachusetts
Buildings and structures in Framingham, Massachusetts
Former Episcopal church buildings in the United States
Churches on the National Register of Historic Places in Massachusetts
Churches in Middlesex County, Massachusetts
Framingham State University
National Register of Historic Places in Middlesex County, Massachusetts